Gaocheng is a town of Sui County in northeastern Hubei province, China, located in the western foothills of the Dabie Mountains about  northeast of the county seat. , it has 1 residential community and 13 villages under its administration.

Administrative divisions 
One community:
Gaocheng

Thirteen villages:
Daqiao, Longwangmiao, Meizigou, Leijiaci, Qilita, Xinwu, Sanqingguan, Luojiaqiao, Qianjin, Xiejiadian, Qigudian, Songduo, Gaohuang

See also 
 List of township-level divisions of Hubei

References 

Township-level divisions of Hubei
Sui County, Hubei